Titusville Area High School is a public high school in Titusville, Pennsylvania. The school serves about 660 students in grades 9-12. The main feeder school is Titusville Middle School.

School history
Titusville Area High School was originally constructed in 1931.  It was financed and given to the community by Mary Colestock in honor of her husband. Subsequent additions took place in 1941, 1957, and 1965, at which time the junior high wing was added. More additions, along with a major renovation took place in 1979, at which time a 25-meter swimming pool was added. The junior high students moved from the school to a sole middle school building in 1999, after which, a major renovation took place to the entire structure including improvements for energy-efficiency and student safety.

Titusville High School has an active alumni association that was organized in 1996 and has an endowed scholarship fund that exceeds one million dollars. Ida Tarbell graduated from Titusville High School in 1896 and is one of its most famous graduates.  Another well-known graduate was John Heisman who began his football career by playing on the high school team for three years before graduating in 1887.

Athletics
Titusville Area is part of PIAA District 10

Boys Sports 

Baseball -  AA
Basketball -  AAA
Cross Country - AA
Football - AA
Golf - AAAA
Soccer AA
Swimming and Diving - AA
Tennis - AA
Track and Field - AA
Wrestling - AAA

Girls Sports 
Basketball - AAA
Cross Country - AA
Soccer - AA
Softball - AA
Swimming and Diving - AA
Track and Field - AA
Volleyball - AA

Alumni 
Ray Tesser- American Football Player

Mason Levi- Singer

Ida Tarbell- Author and Journalist

John Heisman- NFL Player and Coach. The best college player receives a trophy called the Heisman trophy which is named after him.

J.J Bleday- MLB Player

References

External links

Public high schools in Pennsylvania
Schools in Venango County, Pennsylvania
1931 establishments in Pennsylvania
Educational institutions established in 1931
Titusville, Pennsylvania